The greeneye spurdog (Squalus chloroculus) is a species of dogfish described in 2007. It is a member of the family Squalidae, found off the coast of southeastern Australia. It was considered conspecific with the shortspine spurdog.

Taxonomy
The widely-distributed shortspine spurdog (Squalus mitsukurii) was found to comprise a number of distinct species; populations from southern Australian waters were described as Squalus chloroculus in 2007, the holotype collected off Portland, Victoria in 1998. The species name is derived from the Ancient Greek chloros "green" and Latin oculus "eye".

Description
The greeneye spurdog is a robust dogfish with a fusiform body shape, bright green eyes, and overall grey colour. The underparts are paler: paler grey chin and throat to grey-white along the body and tail. The dorsal fins are pale grey with black margins. The pectoral and pelvic fins are grey with paler trailing edges and undersurfaces. The caudal fin is mostly grey with a dark patch over the notch.

Distribution and habitat

The greeneye spurdog is one of four species identified as threatened with extinction by trawling in a 2021 report. The species is caught up in demersal trawling and automatic longline fishing on the upper continental slope by the Southern and Eastern Scalefish and Shark fishery and the Great Australian Bight Trawl Fishery.

References

greeneye spurdog
Marine fish of Southern Australia
Marine fish of Tasmania
greeneye spurdog
greeneye spurdog
greeneye spurdog